Dark Dream  is a paranormal/suspense novel written by American author Christine Feehan. It was originally published in the anthologies After Twilight (2001) and Dark Dreamers (2006) before appearing on its own in 2010. It is the Seventh book in her Dark Series, which to date has 20 titles.

Plot summary
Dark Dream tells the story of Falcon and Sara.  Sara is Falcon's lifemate; he has returned to his homeland to meet the now Prince Mikhail Dubrinsky & his lifemate Raven (hope of their species) in the thought of ending his barren existence little did he know life more for him. Who has sought his true love for centuries, for only she can save him from becoming a vampire, a beast driven to kill and destroy. When he rescues Sara Marten from a gang of street punks, he knows he has found the woman he has sought all his life .
Sara has spent fifteen years hiding from a vampire who destroyed her family when she was a girl. At first, she believes Falcon to be him, or something like him. When she learns the truth, she accepts what must be, but holds off on committing to him until the children she has been rescuing and caring for are safe. Will she be able to escape the one who wants her death and give her love to her destined mate before he becomes a monster equal to the one hunting her?

Awards
2001 PEARL AWARDS
ParaNormal Excellence Awards in Romantic Literature
Best Shapeshifter
Best Overall Paranormal

2001 Romantic Times Reviewers' Choice Awards 
Won - Best Vampire Romance
Nominee - Mainstream Novels

2001 RIO Dorothy Parker Awards 
3rd Place - Paranormal Romances

2001 Reader's Choice Awards from Love Romances 
Honorable Mention - Best Paranormal Romance
Honorable Mention - Best Vampire Romance

2001 RBL Romantica Hughie Awards 
Won - Best Cover

See also

Dark Prince
Dark Desire
Dark Gold
Dark Magic
Carpathians

References

2001 American novels
Novels by Christine Feehan
American vampire novels